Cuareim is a village in the Artigas Department of northern Uruguay.

Geography
It is located on the shores of the Cuareim River and is northeast of Bella Unión, forming a rural suburb of the city.

Population
In 2011 Cuareim had a population of 710.
 
Source: Instituto Nacional de Estadística de Uruguay

References

External links
INE map of Franquia and Cuareim

Populated places in the Artigas Department